ASP.NET Dynamic Data is a Ruby on Rails-inspired web application scaffolding framework from Microsoft, shipped as an extension to ASP.NET, that can be used to build data-driven web applications. It exposes tables in a database by encoding it in the URI of the ASP.NET web service, and the data in the table is automatically rendered to HTML. The process of rendering can be controlled using custom design templates. Internally, it discovers the database schema by using the database metadata.

ASP.NET Dynamic Data was originally shipped as part of the "ASP.NET 3.5 Extensions" package in 2007, and was incorporated into the .NET Framework 3.5 Service Pack 1, which was released August 11, 2008.

References

Further reading

External links

ASP.NET Dynamic Data Introduction
ASP.NET Extensions Preview

Dynamic Data